Sir Antonio Pappano (born 30 December 1959) is an English-Italian conductor and pianist. He is currently music director of the Royal Opera House and of the Orchestra dell'Accademia Nazionale di Santa Cecilia.  He is scheduled to become chief conductor of the London Symphony Orchestra in 2024.

Early life
Pappano was born in Epping, Essex. Pappano's family had relocated to England from Castelfranco in Miscano near Benevento, Italy, in 1958, and at the time of his birth his parents worked in the restaurant business. His father, Pasquale Pappano, was by vocation a singing teacher.

When Pappano was 13 years old, he moved with his family to Connecticut. After musical training in piano, composition, and conducting, he became a rehearsal accompanist at the New York City Opera at the age of 21.

Career
Pappano attracted the attention of fellow pianist and conductor Daniel Barenboim, and became his assistant at the Bayreuth Festival. He worked in Barcelona and Frankfurt, and served as an assistant to Michael Gielen.

Pappano's first conducting appearance at Den Norske Opera was in 1987, and he became music director there in 1990. From 1992 to 2002, Pappano served as Music Director of Royal Theatre of La Monnaie Brussels, Belgium.  He was principal guest conductor of the Israel Philharmonic Orchestra from 1997 to 1999.  In 2005, Pappano became music director of the Orchestra dell'Accademia Nazionale di Santa Cecilia.  He is scheduled to stand down from the Santa Cecilia post in 2023.

In 2002, Pappano was named the Music Director of the Royal Opera House (ROH), Covent Garden.  Pappano was the youngest conductor to lead the orchestra of the ROH, accompanying the Royal Opera and Royal Ballet.  At Covent Garden, Pappano and Kasper Holten, the ROH Director of Opera, shared responsibility for production.  The ROH contract has renewed Pappano's contract several times, to 2017, and to 2023. BBC Radio broadcast in 2017 an hour-long documentary of Pappano's preparation of a new production of La Boheme at the Royal Opera House. In March 2021, the ROH announced the latest extension of Pappano's contract through the 2023–2024 season, and the scheduled conclusion of Pappano's tenure at the close of the 2023–2024 season. 

Pappano had first guest-conducted the London Symphony Orchestra (LSO) in 1996.  He has returned as guest conductor to the LSO on over 70 occasions, and made several recordings with the LSO.  In March 2021, the LSO announced the appointment of Pappano as its next chief conductor, effective in September 2024.  He is scheduled to hold the title of chief conductor-designate in the orchestra's 2023–2024 London season. He returned to the Metropolitan Opera in 2021 to conduct Die Meistersinger von Nürnberg.

Awards and honours
Pappano's awards and honours include Gramophone’s ‘Artist of the Year’ (2000), the 2003 Olivier Award for Outstanding Achievement in Opera, the 2004 Royal Philharmonic Society Music Award, and the Académie du Disque Lyrique’s Bruno Walter prize. On 17 January 2013 he received the Incorporated Society of Musicians' Distinguished Musician Award. He was awarded the Gold Medal of the Royal Philharmonic Society in 2015.

Pappano was knighted in the 2012 New Year Honours for services to music.  In 2012, he was made a Cavaliere di Gran Croce of the Republic of Italy.

Personal life
Pappano is married to Pamela Bullock, an American vocal coach and they live in London.

Recordings
Pappano records regularly for Warner Classics. His recordings include:
 Harrison Birtwistle: The Minotaur
 Philippe Boesmans: Wintermärchen
 Jules Massenet: Manon, Werther
 Giacomo Puccini: Il Trittico, La Bohème, La Rondine, Tosca, Madama Butterfly
 Gioachino Rossini: Stabat Mater, William Tell
 Giuseppe Verdi: Don Carlo, Il Trovatore, Messa da Requiem, Aida
 Richard Wagner: Tristan und Isolde
 Hugo Wolf: Lieder, with tenor Ian Bostridge
 Antonín Dvořák: Symphony No. 9 & Cello Concerto
 Sergei Rachmaninoff: Symphony No.2
 Sergei Rachmaninoff: Piano Concerto No. 1 & Piano Concerto No. 2, with Leif Ove Andsnes

Television
Pappano has presented for the BBC including:
 Pappano's Classical Voices, a four-part series exploring the great roles and the greatest singers of the last 100 years through the prism of the main classical voice types – soprano, tenor, mezzo-soprano, baritone and bass.
 Opera Italia (BBC, 2010) – a three-part series tracing the history of Italian opera. The first episode covers the beginnings of opera, from Monteverdi to Rossini, plus discussing Handel and Mozart who were pivotal in the development of the art form.  The second episode examines six of Verdi's most famous works – Nabucco, Rigoletto, Don Carlo, Otello, Falstaff and La Traviata. The third episode covers five of Puccini's most popular operas – La Boheme, Tosca, Madame Butterfly, Gianni Schicchi and Turandot.

References

Sources
Maeckelbergh, Lucrèce, Antonio Pappano: Con Passione. Snoeck, 2006. .

External links

 IMG Artists page on Antonio Pappano
 Warner Classics page on Antonio Pappano 
 Bruce Duffie, Interview with Antonio Pappano, 8 December 1996

1959 births
Living people
British classical pianists
Male classical pianists
Répétiteurs
British male conductors (music)
Music directors (opera)
Italian British musicians
British harpsichordists
Honorary Members of the Royal Academy of Music
Knights Bachelor
Conductors (music) awarded knighthoods
English people of Italian descent
Royal Opera House
Royal Philharmonic Society Gold Medallists
21st-century British conductors (music)
21st-century classical pianists
21st-century British male musicians
20th-century British conductors (music)
20th-century pianists
20th-century British male musicians
20th-century British musicians
Erato Records artists